Woama is a village in  Tankoro Chiefdom, Kono District in the Eastern Province of Sierra Leone, close to the border with Kailahun District. The major industry in the village is petty trading and farming.

External links
http://politicosl.com/2014/06/ebola-kills-57-in-sierra-leone-as-kono-bans-trade-fair/

Villages in Sierra Leone
Eastern Province, Sierra Leone